Eriopygodes is a genus of moths of the family Noctuidae. It was considered a synonym of Lasionycta for some time.

Species
 Eriopygodes discalis Brandt, 1938
 Eriopygodes grammadora Dyar, 1910
 Eriopygodes imbecilla (Fabricius, 1794)

References
Natural History Museum Lepidoptera genus database

Hadeninae